Bonchis is a genus of snout moths. It was described by Francis Walker in 1862, and is known from Trinidad and Brazil.

Species
 Bonchis glanysis Dyar, 1914
 Bonchis lichfoldi (Kaye, 1925)
 Bonchis munitalis (Lederer, 1863)
 Bonchis scoparioides Walker, 1862

References

Chrysauginae
Pyralidae genera